The 1927–28 Scottish Division One season was won by Rangers by five points over nearest rival Celtic. Bo'ness and Dunfermline Athletic finished 19th and 20th respectively and were relegated to the 1928–29 Scottish Division Two.

League table

Results

References

 Statto.com

1927–28 Scottish Football League
Scottish Division One seasons
Scot